A metropolis is a large city or conurbation which is a significant economic, political, and cultural area for a country or region, and an important hub for regional or international connections, commerce, and communications.

A big city belonging to a larger urban agglomeration, but which is not the core of that agglomeration, is not generally considered a metropolis but a part of it. The plural of the word is metropolises, although the Latin plural is metropoles, from the Greek metropoleis.

For urban areas outside metropolitan areas that generate a similar attraction on a smaller scale for their region, the concept of the regiopolis ("regio" for short) was introduced by urban and regional planning researchers in Germany in 2006.

Etymology
Metropolis (μητρόπολις) is a Greek word, coming from μήτηρ, mḗtēr meaning "mother" and πόλις, pólis meaning "city" or "town", which is how the Greek colonies of antiquity referred to their original cities, with whom they retained cultic and political-cultural connections. The word was used in post-classical Latin for the chief city of a province, the seat of the government and, in particular, ecclesiastically for the seat or see of a metropolitan bishop to whom suffragan bishops were responsible. This usage equates the province with the diocese or episcopal see.

In a colonial context, it is the "mother city" of a colony, that is, the city which sent out settlers. The word has distant roots in the colonial past of Ancient Greece with first usage in Middle English around the 14th century. This was later generalized to a city regarded as a center of a specified activity, or any large, important city in a nation.

Africa

Angola
Luanda is the capital and largest city in Angola. It is Angola's primary port, and its major industrial, cultural and urban centre. Its metropolitan area is the most populous Portuguese-speaking city in Africa, with over 8.3 million inhabitants.

Democratic Republic of Congo
Kinshasa is a megacity with a population of about 15 million.  Kinshasa is Africa's third-largest urban area after Cairo and Lagos.  It is projected to be one of the ten biggest cities in the world in 2050.

Egypt
Cairo and Alexandria are considered Egypt's biggest metropolises.

Ethiopia
Addis Ababa is the capital city of Ethiopia, and where the African Union is headquartered. As of 2008 the metro population is approximately 4.5 million.

Ghana
Accra is an economic and administrative hub, and serves as the anchor of the larger Greater Accra Metropolitan Area (GAMA).

Ivory Coast
According to the 2014 census, Abidjan's population was 4.7 million, which is 20 percent of the overall population of the country, and this also makes it the sixth most populous city proper in Africa, after Lagos, Cairo, Kinshasa, Dar es Salaam, and Johannesburg.  It has officially been designated as the "economic capital" of the country.  In 2020 the Urban area population was over 5 million inhabitants.

Kenya
Nairobi is the capital and the largest city of Kenya. The city proper had a population of 4,397,073 in the 2019 census, while the metropolitan area has a population of 9,354,580.

Nigeria
Lagos is projected to be one of the ten biggest cities in the world in 2050.  As of 2015, unofficial figures put the population of "Greater Metropolitan Lagos", which includes Lagos and its surrounding metro area, extending as far as into Ogun State, at approximately 21 million.

Tanzania
With a population increase of 5.6 percent per year from 2002 to 2012, Dar es Salaam is the third-fastest-growing city in Africa, after Bamako and Lagos, and the ninth-fastest-growing in the world. The metro population is expected to reach 15.12 million by 2020.

Uganda
Kampala is the capital and largest city of Uganda. Kampala is reported to be among the fastest-growing cities in Africa, with an annual population growth rate of 4.03 percent.

Asia

Afghanistan
The capital city, Kabul, has grown to become the country's sole metropolis, and is the only city in Afghanistan with more than one million people.

Bangladesh 

In the People's Republic of Bangladesh, there are five metropolitan areas: Dhaka, Chittagong, Rajshahi, Sylhet and Khulna. Lands are highly priced and residents are considered to have a better urban lifestyle. Special police departments are allotted for the metropolitan cities, and there are city corporations for which mayors are elected for five-year regimes. Most of these cities have population density of 35,000/square mile or more. Dhaka is the wealthiest city out of all and is considered a Megacity because its population surpassed 10 million.

China 

China (People's Republic of China) is the fourth-largest country by geographical area and the most populous country with over 1.4 billion people and is also known for its large number of metropoles, with recognised "tiers" that classify mainland metropoles. Nationally, the largest metropoles include Beijing, Shanghai, Guangzhou and Shenzhen, the four cities are classified as the "First-Tier Cities" (一线城市). Second-tier cities are numerous and consist of regional centres, such as Changsha, Chengdu, Chongqing, Hangzhou, Jinan, Nanjing, Qingdao, Shenyang, Tianjin, Wuhan, and Xi'an, etc.

Many of China's metropoles constitute a city cluster, such as the Yangtze River Delta Megalopolis and the Pearl River Delta Megalopolis.

India 

India (Republic of India) is the seventh-largest country by geographical area and the second-most populous country with over 1.3 billion people. The 74th Amendment to the Indian Constitution defines a metropolitan area as an area having a population of 10 Lakh or 1 Million or more, comprised in one or more districts and consisting of two or more Municipalities or Panchayats or other contiguous areas, specified by the Governor by public notification to be a Metropolitan area. As of 2011 Census of India, India has 46 other cities with populations greater than one million. Delhi, Mumbai, Kolkata, Chennai, Bangalore, Hyderabad, Pune, Ahmedabad, Visakhapatnam, Kochi, are among the largest of 23 metropolitan cities in India.

Indonesia 

In Indonesia, the metropolitan cities are in Jabodetabek (Jakarta, Bekasi, Bogor, Depok, and Tangerang), the biggest metropolitan area in Southeast Asia and the fifth biggest metropolitan area in the world (2007). The other metropolises are Bandung, Medan, Semarang, and Surabaya.

Iran

In Iran, the metropolitan cities are in Tehran and Mashhad, and other cities such as Shiraz, Karaj, Isfahan, Tabriz, Ahvaz, Rasht and Kermanshah.

Japan 

The Japanese legal term to (都) is by designation to be translated as "metropolis". however existing translations predate the designation. Structured like a prefecture instead of a normal city, there is only one to in Japan, namely Tokyo. , Japan has 12 other cities with populations greater than one million. The same Kanji character in Chinese, or in generic Japanese (traditional or non-specific), translates variously—city, municipality, special municipality—all qualify.

Malaysia 
In Malaysia, the capital Kuala Lumpur is the largest city, with a population of 7.8 million. The other metropolises in Malaysia are Johor Bahru, Seremban, Malacca City, Shah Alam, Kuantan, Kuala Terengganu, Kota Bahru, Ipoh, Georgetown, Alor Setar, Kangar, Kota Kinabalu and Kuching.

Pakistan 
According to the census of 2017, there are about 12 metropolitan areas in Pakistan each with a metro population of at least 2 million and city proper population of at least 0.5 million. Karachi is the largest metropolitan area of Pakistan with a population of about 16.01 million, followed by Lahore (11.12 million), Faisalabad (7.873 million), Islamabad-Rawalpindi (7.412 million), Gujranwala (5.01 million), Multan (4.745 million), Peshawar (4.269 million), Sargodha (3.903 million), Sialkot (3.893 million), Bahawalpur (3.668 million), Quetta (2.275 million) and Hyderabad (2.199 million).

Philippines 

The Philippines has three metropolises as defined by the National Economic and Development Authority. They are Manila, Cebu, and Davao

Metropolitan Manila, or Metro Manila, is the metropolitan region encompassing the city of Manila and its surrounding areas in the Philippines. It is composed of 16 cities and 1 municipality namely the city of Manila, Caloocan, Las Piñas, Makati, Malabon, Mandaluyong, Marikina, Muntinlupa, Navotas, Pasay, Pasig, Parañaque, Quezon City, San Juan, Taguig, Valenzuela and the municipality of Pateros. The region is the political, economic, social, cultural, and educational center of the Philippines. As proclaimed by Presidential Decree No. 940, Metro Manila as a whole is the Philippines' seat of government but the city of Manila is the capital. The largest city in the metropolis is Quezon City, while the largest business district is the Makati Central Business District.

Singapore 

The Republic of Singapore is a sovereign island city-state and a metropolis. The country has no capital city.

South Korea 
In the Republic of Korea there are seven special and metropolitan cities at autonomous administrative levels. These are the most populous metropolitan areas in the country. In decreasing order of the population of 2015 census, they are Seoul, Busan, Incheon, Daegu, Daejeon, Gwangju and Ulsan.

According to the census of 2015, cities of Changwon and Suwon also qualify for being elevated to the level of metropolitan cities (having population over 1 million), but any future plans to promote them into metropolitan city are unlikely to be accepted because of political concerns about the structure of administrative divisions. There are also some county-level cities with increasing population near 1 million, namely Goyang, Yongin, and Seongnam, but they are also unlikely to be promoted into metropolitan city because they are all satellite cities of Seoul.

Sri Lanka 
The City of Colombo is the largest city in Sri Lanka. The Colombo Metropolitan Area is Sri Lanka's most urbanized region with a population of over 5 million people.

Taiwan
Taipei City is the political, economic, and cultural centre of Taiwan. The Taipei–Keelung metropolitan area consists of 4 administrative divisions (Taipei, Keelung, New Taipei, and sometimes including Taoyuan) with a total of more than 9 million residents. The metropolis houses the largest international airport in Taiwan and the 36th busiest airport in the world – Taiwan Taoyuan International Airport, which has an annual passenger traffic of nearly 50 million.

Turkey 

In Turkey the metropolitan cities are described as "büyükşehir". There are 30 metropolitan municipalities in Turkey now. The largest by far is İstanbul, followed by Ankara, İzmir and Bursa.

United Arab Emirates

There are 8 metropolises in the UAE: Dubai, Abu Dhabi, Sharjah, Al Ain, Ajman, Ras Al-Khaimah, Fujairah, and Umm Al-Quwain. Of these, Dubai is the largest.

Uzbekistan
Tashkent is Uzbekistan's most populous city and the only with over one million residents.

Europe

Austria 
Vienna is the capital city of Austria, an old imperial city, and the seat of many international organisations, including OPEC, as well as hosting a main office of the United Nations. Together with its cultural acumen and history, these features make Vienna a true global metropolis, the only one in Austria.

Belgium  
The region of Brussels contains the capital city of Belgium with a population of over 1.2 million people, it is the largest urban area in the Benelux. The region is the seat of the European Union, NATO and various other international institutions such as the World Customs Organization. It is nicknamed the 'Capital of Europe'.

Bosnia and Herzegovina 

Sarajevo is  the capital and  the largest city of Bosnia and Herzegovina, seat of the country's Presidency, government, parliament and the only metropolis in the country.

Czech Republic 
Prague is the Czech Republic's only metropolis, with more than 1.3 million people living within the city limits and with more than 2.6 million living in its metropolitan area. This makes the Prague metropolitan area one of largest in Europe.

Denmark 
In Denmark the only metropolis is the capital, Copenhagen, situated in the Capital Region of Denmark. It has more than 750,000 people living in city proper and 1.28 million in its urban area.

Finland 
Finland's capital, Helsinki, along with the neighboring areas (including Espoo, Kauniainen and Vantaa) forms a metropolitan area with an approximate population of 1.45 million people. This area is the only metropolis in the country.

France 

A 2014 law allowed any group of communes to cooperate in a larger administrative division called a métropole. One métropole, Lyon, also has status as a department.

France's national statistics institute, Insee, designates 12 of the country's urban areas as metropolitan areas. Paris, Lyon and Marseille are the biggest, the other nine being Toulouse, Lille, Bordeaux, Nice, Nantes, Strasbourg, Rennes, Grenoble and Montpellier.

Germany 

The largest German city by administrative borders is Berlin, while Rhine-Ruhr is the largest metropolitan area (with more than 10 million people). The importance of a city is measured with three groups of indicators, also called metropolitan functions: The decision making and control function, the innovation and competition function, and the gateway function. These functions are seen as key domains for metropolitan regions in developing their performance.

In spatial planning, a metropolis is usually observed within its regional context, thus the focus is mainly set on the metropolitan regions. These regions can be mono central or multi central. Eleven metropolitan regions have been defined due to these indicators: Berlin-Brandenburg, Bremen-Oldenburg, Dresden-Halle-Leipzig, Frankfurt-Rhine-Main, Hamburg, Hannover-Braunschweig-Göttingen-Wolfsburg, Munich, Nuremberg, Rhine-Neckar, Rhine-Ruhr (with Cologne/Bonn), and Stuttgart.

Hungary 
Budapest has a population of 1,750,000, more than eight times the population of the second largest city, Debrecen.

Italy 

As of January 1, 2015, there are 14 "metropolitan cities" in Italy. Rome, Milan, Naples and other big cores have taken in urban zones from their surrounding areas and merged them into the new entities, which have been home for one out of three Italians. The provinces remained in the parts of the country not belonging to any Città Metropolitana.

Netherlands 
The Randstad is in the Blue Banana and encompasses both the Amsterdam metropolitan area and Rotterdam–The Hague metropolitan area.

Poland 

The Union of Polish Metropoles, established in 1990, is an organization of the largest cities in the country. Currently twelve cities are members of the organization, of which 11 have more than a quarter-million inhabitants. The largest metropolitan area in Poland, if ranked solely by the number of inhabitants, is the Silesian Metropolis (in fact a metroplex), with around 3 million inhabitants (5 million inhabitants in the Silesian metropolitan area), followed by Warsaw, with around 1.7 million inhabitants in the city proper and 3.1 million in the Warsaw metropolitan area. The Silesian Metropolis is an initiative of recent years attempting to unite a large conurbation into one official urban unit. Other Polish metropoles are Kraków, Łódź, Wrocław, Poznań, Tricity, Szczecin and Bydgoszcz–Toruń.

Romania 

Romania has one big metropolis, Bucharest with a population of around 2.5 million people. Other metropolitan areas with populations of about half a million people are Cluj-Napoca, Iași, Timișoara, Brașov, Constanța, Galați and Craiova.

Russia 

Moscow is the capital and largest city of Russia, with a population estimated at 12.4 million residents within the city limits, while over 17 million residents in the urban area, and over 20 million residents in the Moscow Metropolitan Area. Moscow is among the world's largest cities, being the most populous city entirely within Europe, the most populous urban area in Europe, the most populous metropolitan area in Europe, and also the largest city by land area on the European continent. Saint Petersburg, the cultural capital, is the second-largest city, with a population of roughly 5.4 million inhabitants. Other major urban areas are Yekaterinburg, Novosibirsk, Kazan, Nizhny Novgorod, and Krasnodar.

Spain 

Spain has around 15 metropolitan areas with a population greater than 500,000 people. The largest is Madrid, located in the center of the Iberian peninsula and its the seat of the government and the monarch of Spain, with a metropolitan area of almost 7 million people surpassing the limits of its own autonomous community and making it one of the largest of Europe; Barcelona is the second largest city of Spain its metropolitan area comprise 5.5 million people with its limits surpassing its own province, other large cities are Valencia, and Sevilla.

United Kingdom 

In the United Kingdom, the term the Metropolis was historically used to exclusively refer to London, or the London conurbation. The term is retained by the London police force, the Metropolitan Police Service (the "Met"). The chief officer of the Metropolitan Police is formally known as the Commissioner of Police of the Metropolis.

Since 1974 six conurbations in England (outside London) have been known as metropolitan counties, each divided into metropolitan districts. These counties are South Yorkshire (centred on the city of Sheffield), the West Midlands (including Birmingham), West Yorkshire (including Leeds), Merseyside (including Liverpool), Greater Manchester and Tyne & Wear (including Newcastle-upon-Tyne). Greater Glasgow, South Hampshire and Greater Nottingham are also large conurbations.

North America

Canada 
Canada's six largest metropoles are Toronto, Montreal, Vancouver, Ottawa, Calgary, and Edmonton. Statistics Canada defines a census metropolitan area as one or more adjacent municipalities situated around a major urban core where the urban core has a population of at least 100,000. Canada's most populated metropole is the City of Toronto, with a population of 2.7 million and a metropolitan population of over 6 million people. It is also the heart of Canada's finance and banking industry.

Mexico 

In Mexico, the term metropolis is used to refer to an urban area of economic, political, and cultural importance. Mexico City represents all three factors as it is the country's capital and financial center with 27 million people. Other metropolises are Monterrey and Guadalajara, both metropolitan areas with a population over 6,000,000 inhabitants.

United States 

In the United States, an incorporated area or group of areas having a population more than 50,000 is required to have a metropolitan planning organization in order to facilitate major infrastructure projects and to ensure financial solvency. Thus, a population of 50,000 or greater has been used as a de facto standard to define a metropolis in the United States. A similar definition is used by the United States Census Bureau. The bureau defines a Metropolitan Statistical Area as "at least one urbanized area of 50,000 or more inhabitants." The six largest metropolitan areas in the USA are New York, Los Angeles, Chicago, Dallas, Houston, and Washington, D.C., with New York being the largest.

Oceania

Australia 

The Government of Australia defines a metropolitan area as any statistical division or district with a population of more than 100,000. According to this definition, there are currently 19 metropolitan areas in Australia, including every state capital. By population, the largest metropolitan area is Sydney (urban area population at 2020 Census of 5,367,206) and the smallest is Bendigo (urban area population at 2020 Census of 100,632). Rapid urban growth in Victoria has seen the 'Manhattanization' of Melbourne, with high-rise clusters in South Yarra, Box Hill, Moonee Ponds and Footscray. The regional city of Geelong which is approximately 40 miles south west of Melbourne, has seen the emergence of high-rise office and apartment buildings in recent years. Geelong is the fastest growing regional city in Australia, and its growth will transform the Port Phillip region in a similar manner to San Francisco's Bay Area. (urban area population at 2020 Census of 160,991).

South America

Argentina 

In Argentina, Buenos Aires is the principal metropolis with a population of around 15.5 million. The Greater Buenos Aires conurbation, which also includes several Buenos Aires Province districts, constitutes the third-largest conurbation in Latin America. Buenos Aires is the main political, financial, industrial, commercial, and cultural hub of Argentina.

Brazil 
In Brazil, the Greater São Paulo is the principal metropolis with over 21 million inhabitants. In the larger cities, such as São Paulo and Rio de Janeiro (population 12 million), favelas (slums) grew up over decades as people migrated from rural areas in order to find work. The term used in Brazilian Portuguese for a metropolitan area is Região Metropolitana. Other metropolises in Brazil with more than one million inhabitants include: Belém, Belo Horizonte, Brasília, Campinas, Curitiba, Fortaleza, Goiânia, Maceió, Manaus, Porto Alegre, Recife, Salvador and São Luís.

Chile 
The primary metropolis in Chile is its capital: the city of Santiago, with a population of 7 million, living across its metropolitan area. Santiago is the main political, financial, industrial, commercial, and cultural hub of Chile. The other two metropolises in the country are the conurbations of Valparaíso and Concepción with a population of nearly 1 million each.

Colombia 
In Colombia, Bogotá is the main metropolis with over 13 million inhabitants residing in its Metropolitan Area, which includes boroughs like Soacha, Mosquera, Cota, and Chía. The second metropolis in Colombia is Medellín, which includes such boroughs as Envigado, Itagüi, La Estrella, and Sabaneta. This metropolitan area is known for having the first and only Metro in Colombia, the Medellín Metro. Bogotá has the Transmilenio, a Rapid Transit Metro-bus system.

Peru 
The Lima metropolitan area is Peru's capital and largest city with over 10 million inhabitants, more than one third of the total national population.

Metropolis as a mainland area 
In France, Portugal, Spain, and the Netherlands, the word metropolis (métropole (Fr.) / metrópole (Port.) / metrópoli (Spa.) / metropool (Dutch)) designates the mainland part of a country situated on or close to the European mainland; in the case of France, this means France without its overseas departments. For Portugal and Spain during the Spanish Empire and Portuguese Empire period, the term was used to designate Portugal or Spain minus its colonies (the Ultramar). In France métropole can also be used to refer to a large urban agglomeration; for example, "La Métropole de Lyon" (the Lyon Metropolis).

See also 
 Megalopolis
 Metropolitan area

Other city types 
 Global city
 Megacity

Lists 
 List of largest cities

Planning theories 
 New Urbanism
 Smart growth
 Transit-oriented development

Others 
 C40 Cities Climate Leadership Group
 Ekistics
 Settlement hierarchy
 Sustainable city

References

Further reading 

 Census.gov, U.S. Census Bureau, About Metropolitan and Micropolitan Statistics
 MetroForum.com, forum dedicated to discussions on metropolis
 Blog.ar2com.de, a podcast with a worldwide analysis of megacities (focus Latin America)
 : research group, university of Paris-Diderot, France
 See Ronald Daus´s bibliography, researcher at the Free University of Berlin

Urban geography
Demographics
Lists of cities
Greek colonization
Urban areas
Settlement geography